David Gordon Collier OBE (born 22 April 1955) is an English sports administrator and businessman.

Collier became the second chief executive of the England and Wales Cricket Board (ECB) when he was appointed in October 2004, succeeding Tim Lamb. He has a business background having spent ten years working in the travel and leisure industry, including posts such as a marketing manager within a small section of Sema Group plc, an Anglo French computer systems company (1986–1988), senior vice-president of American Airlines (1988–1992) and managing director of Servisair plc (1992–1993).

Education
Collier was educated at Loughborough Grammar School, a day and boaŕding independent school for boys in the market town of Loughborough in Leicestershire, followed by Loughborough University, where he read Sports Science and Recrwational Management.

Life and career
Collier gained considerable cricket administration experience with four counties – as assistant secretary of Essex (1980–1983) and as chief executive of Gloucestershire (1983–1986), Leicestershire (1993–1999) and Nottinghamshire (1999–2004), before his ECB appointment.

Collier was roundly criticized in some sections of the British media for his role in the sale of television rights to Rupert Murdoch's Sky TV. Proponents of the move, including Collier himself, have pointed out that cricket desperately needs the investment which only comes from such rights sales. He also insisted that he wanted to see a "thriving television market", hitting back at claims that Sky's audience for live cricket averaged 200,000 viewers, compared with Channel 4's peak audience of nine million.

Collier has been an international hockey umpire since 1985, and in 2002 played an important part in organising a rescue package which bailed out England Hockey.

Collier married Jennifer Pendleton in 1980. They have one daughter and two sons.

Collier was appointed Officer of the Order of the British Empire (OBE) in the 2015 New Year Honours for services to cricket.

In March 2015, Collier was appointed CEO of the Rugby League International Federation.

Collier is also Chairman of HIX Management Group, a Sports Management Company co-founded by David & ex-professional Golfer Andrew Hicks.

References 

1955 births
Living people
Chief Executives of the England and Wales Cricket Board
English cricket administrators
English businesspeople
People educated at Loughborough Grammar School
Alumni of Loughborough University
Officers of the Order of the British Empire